The Politics of Sardinia (Sardinia, Italy) takes place in a framework of a presidential representative democracy, whereby the President of Regional Government is the head of government, and of a pluriform multi-party system. Executive power is exercised by the Regional Government. Legislative power is vested in both the government and the Regional Council of Sardinia.

Legislative branch

The Regional Council of Sardinia (Consiglio Regionale della Sardegna) is composed of 60 members. The Assembly is elected for a five-year term, but, if the President suffers a vote of no confidence, resigns or dies, under the simul stabunt vel simul cadent clause, also the Assembly will be dissolved and there will be a fresh election.

Executive branch
The Regional Government (Giunta Regionale) is presided by the President of the Region (Presidente della Regione), who is elected for a five-year term, and is composed by the President and the Ministers (Assessori), who are currently 12.

List of presidents

Local government

Provinces

Municipalities
Sardinia is also divided in 377 comuni (municipalities), which have even more history, having been established in the Middle Ages when they were the main places of government.

Provincial capitals

Others with 25,000+ inhabitants

Political parties and elections

Latest regional election

The latest regional election took place on 24 February 2019. Christian Solinas of the Sardinian Action Party was elected president.

References

External links
Sardinia Region
Regional Council of Sardinia
Constitution of Sardinia